Vlacheika or Vlachaiika may refer to several places in Greece:

Vlacheika, Achaea, a village in Achaea, western Peloponnese
Vlacheika, Troezen, a settlement in the eastern Peloponnese